State Government Insurance Office (SGIO) may refer to:
GIO Insurance, formerly the Government Insurance Office of New South Wales
 State Government Insurance Office (Queensland)
 State Government Insurance Office (Western Australia)